The Ascent at Roebling's Bridge is a residential building in Covington, Kentucky, United States, in the greater Cincinnati area. Designed by Daniel Libeskind, the building sits along the Ohio River across from the Roebling Suspension Bridge. It was commissioned in 2004 and was completed in March 2008 at a cost of approximately $50 million. Many newspapers have associated the Ascent with a trend toward signature architecture for residential buildings.

Design
Libeskind cites the Ohio River and the Roebling Bridge as influences for his design. The concrete structure slopes outward from its base on its eastern face and is clad in a glass curtain wall. It houses 70 condominiums.

Studio Daniel Libeskind collaborated with GBBN Architects, THP Limited, and KLH Engineering for the building's construction.

Notes

External links
The Ascent at Roebling's Bridge -- Official Site
Emporis listing
Photo Gallery of The Ascent 

Residential buildings completed in 2008
Residential skyscrapers in Kentucky
Covington, Kentucky
Daniel Libeskind buildings
Skyscrapers in Kentucky